Yerraguntla Junction railway station (station code:YA), is the primary railway station serving Yerraguntla town in the Indian state of Andhra Pradesh. The station comes under the jurisdiction of Guntakal railway division of South Central Railway zone. A new railway line connecting Nandyal of Kurnool district commissioned recently

Station category 
It is one of the 'D' category railway station of Guntakal railway division.

Gallery

References

External links 

Guntakal railway division
YERRAGUNTLA